Adel Salah Mahmoud Eid El-Tawil (born 15 August 1978) is a German singer, songwriter and producer. Besides his solo career, he is part of the popular German duo Ich + Ich and a former member of the boy band The Boyz.

Early life
Tawil was born in Berlin. His father Salah Tawil is Egyptian and his mother is Tunisian. He is the first born of three, having a younger brother, Hatem, and a sister, Rascha.

Musical career
During the end of the 1990s, Tawil was part of the German boyband The Boyz. Since 2004, he and Annette Humpe formed the duo known as Ich + Ich. They have released three albums, Ich + Ich (2005), Vom Selben Stern (2007) and Gute Reise (2009).

In 2007, Tawil teamed up with rapper Azad and released the song "Prison Break Anthem (Ich glaub' an dich)", which is the opening theme for the German version of Prison Break. He made another solo appearance with Tobias Schenke for the song "Niemand hat gesagt".

In 2007, Tawil held three spots in the top ten with two released singles and one album.

On 8 November 2013, he released his first solo album, Lieder, in Germany, and also toured in 2014.

Personal life 

In 2011, Tawil married his longtime girlfriend Jasmin Weber in a private ceremony in Berlin.
In 2014, they were separated. He currently lives with his girlfriend Lena.

Discography

Studio albums

Singles
As lead artist

As featured artist

References

External links

Official website
 

1978 births
Living people
German Muslims
German artists
Singers from Berlin
German people of Egyptian descent
German people of Tunisian descent
Ich + Ich members
21st-century German  male  singers